Jeffrey Alan Grau (born December 16, 1979) is a former American football long snapper and tight end in the National Football League (NFL) for the Dallas Cowboys and Miami Dolphins. He played college football at UCLA.

Early years
Grau attended Loyola High School, where he didn't have a specific position in the football team. As a junior, he played quarterback and defensive tackle, while the next year, he played tight end and defensive end. As a senior, he posted 64 tackles, 6 sacks, 8 receptions for 68 yards. He helped his team become the CIF Division I runner-up and received All-League honors at defensive end.

In baseball, he played as a first baseman and pitcher, earning All-League honors three times and team MVP twice. As a sophomore, he tallied a .373 batting average. As a junior, he had an 8-1 record (1.52 ERA) and a .380 batting average. As a senior, he had a 4-0 record (1.23 ERA) and a .408 batting average.

College career
Grau walked-on at UCLA, becoming a four-year starter after earning the team's long snapper job during his freshman season. He was awarded a football scholarship prior to his junior season.

Professional career

Washington Redskins
Grau was selected by the Washington Redskins in the seventh round (230th overall) of the 2002 NFL Draft, to play as a long snapper. He was released on August 27.

Dallas Cowboys
In 2002, the Dallas Cowboys spent resources to sign free agent Jeff Robinson to upgrade the long snapper position, but he tore his Anterior cruciate ligament during training camp. Needing a replacement, the team claimed Grau off waivers on August 28. He played in all 16 games and posted 6 special teams tackles.

On August 6, 2003, he was traded to the Tampa Bay Buccaneers in exchange for a conditional draft choice (not exercised).

Tampa Bay Buccaneers
On August 24, 2003, he was released after the Tampa Bay Buccaneers decided to keep Ryan Benjamin as the starting long snapper.

Miami Dolphins
In 2003, after long snapper Ed Perry was lost for the season with a knee injury, the Miami Dolphins first tried to replace him with Sean McDermott, before signing Grau as a free agent on October 14.  He was cut on March 2, 2004, after the team signed William Delahoussaye to compete with Perry.

References

External links
UCLA bio

1979 births
Living people
Players of American football from Los Angeles
Players of American football from Inglewood, California
American football centers
UCLA Bruins football players
Dallas Cowboys players
Miami Dolphins players